Reuyl is a crater in the Aeolis quadrangle of Mars, located at 9.8° south latitude and 193.2° west longitude. It measures 85.9 kilometers in diameter and was named after Dirk Reuyl, a Dutch-American physicist and astronomer (1906–1972) who made astronomical measurements of the diameter of Mars in the 1940s.

See also 
 Planetary nomenclature
 Impact crater
 List of craters on Mars

References

Aeolis quadrangle
Impact craters on Mars